Dharam Bir Sinha  is an Indian politician. He was a Member of Parliament, representing Barh, Bihar in the Lok Sabha the lower house of India's Parliament as a member of the Indian National Congress. He was Minister of State Labour, Information and Tourism in Daroga Prasad Rai cabinet in 1970. He was Union Minister of from State Information and Broadcasting from  1971 to 1977 in Second Indira Gandhi ministry

References

External links
Official biographical sketch in Parliament of India website

India MPs 1971–1977
India MPs 1980–1984
Lok Sabha members from Bihar
1932 births
Indian National Congress politicians
Living people
Indian National Congress (U) politicians
Bihar MLAs 1967–1969
Bihar MLAs 1969–1972